Sacred Heart College, Kochi is an institution of higher education affiliated to the Mahatma Gandhi University, Kottayam. It was established in 1944.

In the year 2000, the college was accredited by the National Accreditation and Assessment Council (NAAC) at the Five Star level, and in 2013 it was re accredited at the A level. It has 21 undergraduate and 20 postgraduate programmes, 1 Integrated PG programmes and a range of diploma and certificate courses. Current Principal is Fr . Jose John CMI.

History

Sacred Heart College, Thevara was established in 1944 by the Sacred Heart Monastery, Thevara, a unit of the CMI (Carmelites of Mary Immaculate) Congregation. In 1958 the college was affiliated to the University of Kerala. In 1983 the college comes under Mahatma Gandhi University, Kottayam.
In 2014 the college became one among the first five autonomous colleges in Kerala.

UG Programmes

Bachelor of Arts 
B.A  Economics
B.A  Sociology
B.A  English Copy Editor (Model II)
B.A. English Language and Literature (Model 1)
B.A. Animation and Graphic Design
B.A. Animation and Visual Effects
B.A. Mass communication and Journalism

Bachelor of Science 
B.Sc. Botany
B.Sc. Chemistry
B.Sc. Computer Applications ( Triple Main ) 
B.Sc. Mathematics
B.Sc. Physics
B.Sc. Zoology
B.Sc. Psychology - Model 1
BCA (Specialization in Mobile Applications and Cloud Technology)

Bachelor of Commerce 
B.B.A. Commerce (Marketing And New Media)
B. Com. Commerce (Finance &Taxation ) - Aided
B. Com. Commerce (Computer Application )- self financing
B. Com Commerce (Finance & Taxation )- self-financing
B. Com Commerce (Travel and Tourism) - self-financing

Oriental Languages 
English
Sanskrit
Malayalam
Hindi
French

PG Programmes

Master of Arts 
M.A. Economics
M.A. English
M.A. Sociology
MA Multimedia - (Self Financing)
MA Graphic Design - (Self Financing)
MCJ (Self Financing)
M.A. Digital Animation

Master of Science 
M. Sc. Aquaculture (Self Financing)
M. Sc. Botany
M. Sc. Chemistry
M. Sc. Applied Chemistry
M. Sc. Mathematics
M. Sc. Physics
M. Sc. Zoology
M. Sc. Environmental Science

Master of Commerce 
M. Com

Notable alumni
 Justice Devan Ramachandran, Judge, High Court of Kerala
 Padma Shri Mammootty, Actor, Indian Film Industry
 M. M. Jacob, Former Governor of Arunachal Pradhesh
Sachin Baby, Cricketer
 K. V. Thomas, politician, member of the 16th Lok Sabha
 Hibi Eden, politician, member of the Legislative Assembly of Kerala
 V. D. Satheesan, politician, member of the Legislative Assembly of Kerala
 P. J. Joseph, politician, member of the Legislative Assembly of Kerala
 P. C. George, politician, member of the Legislative Assembly of Kerala
Soumini Jain, Mayor, Corporation of Kochi
Krishna (Malayalam actor)
Sijoy Varghese, Actor, Ad Film Director
Deepak Dev, Music director, Singer, Producer
Srinda Arhaan, Actress
Aswathi Menon, Actress
K M Mani, Politician
Appu Krishnan, Music Producer, Song Writer
Krishna Praba, Actress
Malavika Krishnadas , Anchor, Actress,Dancer

See also 
 Sacred Heart Higher Secondary School, Thevara

References

Syro-Malabar Catholic church buildings
Carmelite educational institutions
Sacred Heart College, Thevara
Catholic universities and colleges in India
Educational institutions established in 1944
1944 establishments in India
Colleges affiliated to Mahatma Gandhi University, Kerala
Academic institutions formerly affiliated with the University of Madras